The revaluation of all values or transvaluation of all values (German: Umwertung aller Werte) is a concept from the philosophy of Friedrich Nietzsche.

Exposition 
Elaborating the concept in The Antichrist, Nietzsche asserts that Christianity, not merely as a religion but also as the predominant moral system of the Western world, inverts nature, and is "hostile to life".  As "the religion of pity", it elevates the weak over the strong, exalting that which is "ill-constituted and weak" at the expense of that which is full of life and vitality.

Nietzsche contrasts Christianity with Buddhism. He posits that Christianity is "the struggle against sin", whereas Buddhism is "the struggle against suffering"; to Nietzsche, Christianity limits and lowers humankind by assailing its natural and inevitable instincts as depraved ("sin"), whereas Buddhism advises one merely to eschew suffering. While Christianity is full of "revengefulness" and "antipathy" (e.g., the Last Judgment), Buddhism promotes "benevolence, being kind, as health-promoting."  Buddhism is also suggested to be the more "honest" of the two religions, for its being strictly "phenomenalistic", and because "Christianity makes a thousand promises but keeps none."  Martyrdom, rather than being a moral high ground or position of strength, is indicative of an "obtuseness to the question of truth."

Nietzsche's enthusiasm for what he called "transvaluation" stemmed from his contempt for Christianity and the entirety of the moral system that flowed from it: indeed, "contempt of man", as Nietzsche states near the end of The Antichrist. Nietzsche perceived the moral framework of Christian civilization to be oppressive: 
Reproduction derided as sinful
 Life as an "investment" for the promise of an illustrious afterlife
 Breaking the will to live in the real world

The Revaluation of All Values was also the working title of a series of four books Nietzsche was planning to write, only the first of which—The Antichrist—he ever completed. However, one of his schemas for The Will to Power used "The Revaluation of All Values" as a subtitle, and it was this scheme that his sister Elisabeth Förster-Nietzsche used to assemble his notes into the final book with that title.

See also

Master–slave morality

References

Further reading
 

Philosophy of Friedrich Nietzsche
Value (ethics)
Criticism of Christianity